Yamben (Yaben) is a Trans–New Guinea language of Madang Province, Papua New Guinea. It was first documented by Andrew Pick in the 2010s and classified by Pick (2019) as a probable primary branch of Madang, though its precise classification is still pending further research. Although surrounded by Croisilles languages, Yamben is not one of them.

Yamben (Yaben) was not previously noticed by other scholars due to confusion with the nearby language of the same name.

Yamben is spoken in the single village of Yambarik in Imbab ward, Sumgilbar Rural LLG, and is reachable via a few hours' hike into the Adelbert Mountains from Tokain village.

Phonology
Unlike other languages belonging to the Madang branch, Yamben has a palatal nasal consonant (/ɲ/) and a labiovelar consonant series.

Basic vocabulary
Basic vocabulary in Yamben and nearby Croisilles languages:

{| class="wikitable sortable"
! gloss !! Yamben !! Yaben !! Manep !! Gabak !! Barem
|-
| man || dambu || munanu || munu || mur || mamunden
|-
| name || buɲim || uɲim(u) || unim || vin || unim
|-
| fire || aŋgaji || muta || andup || akut || munduv
|-
| tree || aŋgan || namu || mundu || ŋam || wam
|-
| louse || aŋgun || gunu || gunu || igun || gun
|-
| bird || akiem || malʌgwanu || nambe || liweŋ || munuŋgan
|-
| house || mʷan || muɲi || amun || kaven || amun
|-
| tooth || ananji || nʌna || nanaŋ || anek || nanaŋ
|-
| head || kumu || tazi || kumu || daut || sa
|-
| eye || mambudum || magiɲo || musaŋ || mek || muaŋ
|}

References

Madang languages
Languages of Madang Province